The International Journal of Greenhouse Gas Control is a monthly peer-reviewed scientific journal covering research on greenhouse gas control. It is published by Elsevier and the editor-in-chief is John Gale. According to the Journal Citation Reports, the journal has a 2020 impact factor of 3.738,

References

External links 
 
 

Elsevier academic journals
Publications established in 2007
English-language journals
Energy and fuel journals
Environmental science journals
Monthly journals
Climate change and society